The 2018 Parañaque Patriots season is the 1st season of the franchise in the Maharlika Pilipinas Basketball League (MPBL).

Key dates
 January 25, 2018: Inaugural season of the Maharlika Pilipinas Basketball League (MPBL) starts.

Roster

Anta Rajah Cup

Eliminations

Standings

Game log

|- style="background:#bfb;"
| 1
| January 25
| Caloocan
| W 70–60
| Gabriel Dagangon (20)
| Daniel de Guzman (12)
| Ryusei Koga (8)
| Smart Araneta Coliseum
| 1–0

|- style="background:#fcc;"
| 2
| February 1
| Muntinlupa
| L 60–67
| Juneric Baloria (24)
| Harold Arboleda (11)
| Harold Arboleda (8)
| Caloocan Sports Complex
| 1–1
|- style="background:#bfb;"
| 3
| February 8
| Bulacan
| W 74–72
| Jemal Vizcarra (15)
| Juneric Baloria (8)
| Harold Arboleda (5)
| Valenzuela Astrodome
| 2–1
|- style="background:#fcc;"
| 4
| February 15
| Quezon City
| L 54–64
| Dagangon, Vizcarra (12)
| Daniel de Guzman (14)
| Baloria, Koga (3)
| Olivares College Gymnasium
| 2–2
|- style="background:#fcc;"
| 5
| February 22
| Batangas
|L 79–87 (OT)
| Gabriel Dagangon (21)
| Juneric Baloria (10)
| Juneric Baloria (4)
| Batangas City Coliseum
| 2–3

Datu Cup

Eliminations

Game log

|- style="background:#bfb;"
| 1
| June 20
| Valenzuela
| W 76–73
| Mac Montilla (20)
| Harold Arboleda (20)
| Koga, Justiniani (3)
| Angeles University Foundation Gymnasium
| 1–0

|- style="background:#bfb;"
| 2
| July 3
| Cebu City
| W 81–73
| Harold Arboleda (26)
| Harold Arboleda (11)
| Harold Arboleda (6)
| Olivares College Gymnasium
| 2–0
|- style="background:#fcc;"
| 3
| July 16
| @ Pampanga
| L 79–82
| Harold Arboleda (17)
| Harold Arboleda (13)
| Harold Arboleda (8)
| Angeles University Foundation Gymnasium
| 2–1
|- style="background:#fcc;"
| 4
| July 25
| @ Bulacan
| L 58–77
| Jemal Vizcarra (22)
| Allen, Arboleda (9)
| Harold Arboleda (7)
| Bulacan Capitol Gymnasium
| 2–2

References

Parañaque Patriots
Parañaque Patriots Season, 2018